The 2021 CS Nebelhorn Trophy was held on September 22–25, 2021 in Oberstdorf, Germany. It was part of the 2021–22 ISU Challenger Series. It was also the final qualifying event for the 2022 Winter Olympics. Medals were awarded in the disciplines of men's singles, women's singles, pairs, and ice dance.

In December 2020, the International Skating Union designated Nebelhorn Trophy as the official figure skating qualification competition for the 2022 Winter Olympics. The 2009, 2013, and 2017 editions of the event served the same role for the 2010, 2014, and 2018 Winter Olympics, respectively.

Entries 
The International Skating Union published the list of entries on September 2, 2021. Names with an asterisk (*) denote skaters not competing for Olympic qualification.

Changes to preliminary assignments

Results

Men

Women

Pairs

Ice dance

Olympic qualification event 

Initially, a total of six spots per singles event, three spots in pairs, and four spots in ice dance were available at the Nebelhorn Trophy. One additional quota spot became available in men's singles following the 2021 World Championships. Available spots were allocated in descending order of placement among eligible nations.

Only ISU member nations that had not already earned an entry to the Olympics via the 2021 World Championships were allowed to attempt to earn a qualification berth at Nebelhorn Trophy. However, if a country earned two or three spots at the World Championships, but did not have two or three skaters, respectively, qualify for the free skating/dance, then they were allowed to send a skater/team who did not qualify for the free segment at World Championships to Nebelhorn Trophy to qualify the remaining spot. The following ISU member nations were eligible to qualify a second or third spot in the listed disciplines at Nebelhorn Trophy:

Unlike at the World Championships, where countries could qualify more than one spot depending on the placement of their skater(s), at Nebelhorn Trophy, countries could earn only one spot per discipline, regardless of ranking. The following ISU member nations qualified a berth for their National Olympic Committee at Nebelhorn Trophy:

If a country declines to use one or more of its qualified spots for the Olympics, the vacated spot will be awarded using the results of Nebelhorn Trophy in descending order of placement. The following countries are next in line for Olympic quota spots:

Notes

References

External links 
 Nebelhorn Trophy at the International Skating Union
 Nebelhorn Trophy at the Deutsche Eislauf Union
 Results

Nebelhorn Trophy
Nebelhorn Trophy
Nebelhorn Trophy